Herbert Casson may refer to:

 Herbert Newton Casson (1869–1951), Canadian journalist and author
 Herbert Alexander Casson (1867–1952), British administrator in the Indian Civil Service